The Evening News was the first evening newspaper published in Sydney, New South Wales, Australia.  It was  published from 29 July 1867 to 21 March 1931. The Sunday edition was published as the Sunday News.

History
The Evening News was founded in 1867 by Samuel Bennett and was regarded as a "less serious read" than other Sydney newspapers. 
In 1875 labour difficulties forced Bennett to merge The Evening News with another of his papers, The Empire. The Evening News continued to be published until 1931 at which point it was closed by Associated Newspapers, who had acquired most Sydney newspaper titles by that time. A Sunday morning edition was published as Sunday News from 1919-1930.

Digitisation
The paper has been digitised as part of the Australian Newspapers Digitisation Program project of the National Library of Australia.

See also
 List of newspapers in New South Wales

References

External links
 
 

Defunct newspapers published in Sydney
Newspapers on Trove
Publications established in 1867
1867 establishments in Australia
Publications disestablished in 1931
1931 disestablishments in Australia